Frank Gray "Piggy" Ward (April 16, 1867 – October 24, 1912) was a professional baseball player who played as an outfielder in Major League Baseball from 1883 through 1894. He played for the Pittsburgh Pirates, Baltimore Orioles, Cincinnati Reds, Washington Senators, and Philadelphia Phillies.

Ward shares with Earl D. Averill the MLB record of the most consecutive plate appearances resulting in officially getting on base (through either a walk, a base hit or being hit by a pitch) in major league history. From June 16 to June 19 in 1893, Ward officially reached base a record 17 times in 17 consecutive plate appearances, getting 8 hits, drawing 8 walks and being hit by a pitch once.

Ward also holds the record for the youngest non-pitcher to play in the National League, when he made his debut in 1883 aged 16 years, 1 month and 27 days in 1883.

References

External links

1867 births
1912 deaths
19th-century baseball players
American expatriate baseball players in Canada
Philadelphia Quakers players
Pittsburgh Pirates players
Baltimore Orioles (NL) players
Cincinnati Reds players
Washington Senators (1891–1899) players
Major League Baseball outfielders
Major League Baseball second basemen
Baseball players from Pennsylvania
Johnstown (minor league baseball) players
Shamokin Maroons players
Allentown Peanuts players
Shenandoah Hungarian Rioters players
York (minor league baseball) players
Hamilton Hams players
New Orleans (minor league baseball) players
Galveston Sand Crabs players
Spokane (minor league baseball) players
Sacramento Senators players
Minneapolis Millers (baseball) players
Walla Walla Walla Wallas players
Spokane Bunchgrassers players
Milwaukee Brewers (minor league) players
Altoona Mountaineers players
New Orleans Pelicans (baseball) players
Altoona Mud Turtles players
Harrisburg Senators players
Scranton Coal Heavers players
Scranton Miners players
Toronto Canadians players
Albany Senators players
Lancaster Maroons players
Mansfield Haymakers players
Binghamton Crickets (1880s) players
Worcester Farmers players
Hartford Indians players
Wooden Nutmegs players
Norwich Witches players
Butte Miners players
Birmingham Barons players
Butte Fruit Pickers players
Charleston Sea Gulls players
Vancouver Veterans players
Glens Falls-Saratoga Springs players
People from Chambersburg, Pennsylvania